Aberffraw was one of the three medieval cantrefs on the island of Anglesey, north Wales, in the Kingdom of Gwynedd. It lay on the western side of the island on Caernarfon Bay. Its administrative centre was Aberffraw, ancient seat of the Princes of Gwynedd.

The cantref consisted of the two cwmwds of Llifon and Malltraeth.

See also
 Cemais (Anglesey cantref)
 Rhosyr (cantref)

Cantrefs
History of Anglesey